In the geometry of hyperbolic 3-space, the heptagonal tiling honeycomb or 7,3,3 honeycomb a regular space-filling tessellation (or honeycomb). Each infinite cell consists of a heptagonal tiling whose vertices lie on a 2-hypercycle, each of which has a limiting circle on the ideal sphere.

Geometry
The Schläfli symbol of the heptagonal tiling honeycomb is {7,3,3}, with three heptagonal tilings meeting at each edge.  The vertex figure of this honeycomb is a tetrahedron, {3,3}.

Related polytopes and honeycombs 
It is a part of a series of regular polytopes and honeycombs with {p,3,3} Schläfli symbol, and tetrahedral vertex figures:

It is a part of a series of regular honeycombs, {7,3,p}.

It is a part of a series of regular honeycombs, with {7,p,3}.

Octagonal tiling honeycomb

In the geometry of hyperbolic 3-space, the octagonal tiling honeycomb or 8,3,3 honeycomb a regular space-filling tessellation (or honeycomb). Each infinite cell consists of an octagonal tiling whose vertices lie on a 2-hypercycle, each of which has a limiting circle on the ideal sphere.

The Schläfli symbol of the octagonal tiling honeycomb is {8,3,3}, with three octagonal tilings meeting at each edge.  The vertex figure of this honeycomb is an tetrahedron, {3,3}.

Apeirogonal tiling honeycomb

In the geometry of hyperbolic 3-space, the apeirogonal tiling honeycomb or ∞,3,3 honeycomb a regular space-filling tessellation (or honeycomb). Each infinite cell consists of an apeirogonal tiling whose vertices lie on a 2-hypercycle, each of which has a limiting circle on the ideal sphere.

The Schläfli symbol of the apeirogonal tiling honeycomb is {∞,3,3}, with three apeirogonal tilings meeting at each edge.  The vertex figure of this honeycomb is an tetrahedron, {3,3}.

The "ideal surface" projection below is a plane-at-infinity, in the Poincare half-space model of H3. It shows an Apollonian gasket pattern of circles inside a largest circle.

See also 
 Convex uniform honeycombs in hyperbolic space
 List of regular polytopes

References 

Coxeter, Regular Polytopes, 3rd. ed., Dover Publications, 1973. . (Tables I and II: Regular polytopes and honeycombs, pp. 294–296)
 The Beauty of Geometry: Twelve Essays (1999), Dover Publications,  (Chapter 10, Regular Honeycombs in Hyperbolic Space ) Table III
 Jeffrey R. Weeks The Shape of Space, 2nd edition  (Chapters 16–17: Geometries on Three-manifolds I,II)
 George Maxwell, Sphere Packings and Hyperbolic Reflection Groups, JOURNAL OF ALGEBRA 79,78-97 (1982) 
 Hao Chen, Jean-Philippe Labbé, Lorentzian Coxeter groups and Boyd-Maxwell ball packings, (2013)
 Visualizing Hyperbolic Honeycombs arXiv:1511.02851 Roice Nelson, Henry Segerman (2015)

External links 
John Baez, Visual insights: {7,3,3} Honeycomb (2014/08/01) {7,3,3} Honeycomb Meets Plane at Infinity (2014/08/14) 
 Danny Calegari, Kleinian, a tool for visualizing Kleinian groups, Geometry and the Imagination 4 March 2014. 

Honeycombs (geometry)
Heptagonal tilings